La comadrita ("The Child's Godmother") is a 1978 Mexican film directed by Fernando Cortés and starring María Elena Velasco, Fernando Soler, and Sara García. The film is about an indigenous woman who baptizes nearly all the animals on the day of the "blessing of animals" in the town. That is why she is nicknamed La comadrita, for being the godmother of the townspeople's animals.

Cast
María Elena Velasco - María Nicolasa / Doña Nicole Pérez Rodríguez de Papatzi
Fernando Soler - Don Macario
Sara García - Doña Chona / Madamé Choné
Pedro Infante Jr. - Pedro Ramírez / Pedro de Alvarado
Yolanda Ochoa - Lupe
Rafael Inclán - Atanacio
Beatriz Adriana - Irma de Achavál
Marcela López Rey - Marcela de Cobián
Fernando Larrañaga - Pablo Cobián
Polo Ortín - Policía
Carlos Agostí - don Cesar de Achával y Achával
Gloria Jordán - María Antonieta de Achával
Raúl Martínez		
Carlos Rotzinger - Peter, jefe de espías
Antonio Moreno		
Carlos Bravo y Fernández - Sacerdote
Jesús González Leal - don Felipe, presidente municipal de San Martín
Gabriela de Fuentes - Gabrielita
Gustavo del Castillo	
Benjamín Escamilla Espinosa		
Tomas Velasco		
Federico González

See also
 Blessing of animals

External links
 

1978 films
Mexican comedy films
1970s Spanish-language films
1970s Mexican films